ATP-binding cassette sub-family C member 4 (ABCC4), also known as the multidrug resistance-associated protein 4 (MRP4) or multi-specific organic anion transporter B (MOAT-B), is a protein that in humans is encoded by the ABCC4 gene.

ABCC4 acts as a regulator of intracellular cyclic nucleotide levels and as a mediator of cAMP-dependent signal transduction to the nucleus. MRP4/ABCC4 also transports prostaglandins, for example PGE2, out of the cell where they can bind receptors.

MRP4/ABCC4 expression is dysregulated in several cancers  and is also upregulated in peritoneal endometriosis.

Interactive pathway map

See also 
 ATP-binding cassette transporter

References

Further reading

External links 
 
 

ATP-binding cassette transporters